Rosemarie Lang (21 May 1947 – 12 January 2017) was a German operatic mezzo-soprano.

Life 
Born in Grünstädtel, Lang studied at the University of Music and Theatre Leipzig with Elisabeth Breul, Eva Schubert-Hoffmann and Helga Forner. At the 1969 Robert Schumann International Competition for Pianists and Singers she won 2nd prize, and at the 1972 International Johann Sebastian Bach Competition she won 1st prize ("Bach Prize Winner"), both in the "Ladies' Singing" category.

In 1987, she moved to the Staatsoper Unter den Linden. She made her debut there as Clytemnestra in Gluck's Iphigenia in Aulis. She remained an ensemble member of the Staatsoper until her retirement from the stage for health reasons in 2009.

Guest appearances took her to the Salzburg Festival and the Vienna State Opera, among others. In addition to her operatic activities, she also cultivated concert, lied and oratorio singing. Numerous radio and recordings document her artistic activity.

Further reading 
 Kutsch/Riemens: Großes Sängerlexikon. 3rd edition 1997.

References

External links 
 
 

German operatic mezzo-sopranos
1947 births
2017 deaths
People from Schwarzenberg, Saxony